Chester Priory was a priory of Benedictine nuns in Cheshire, England probably established in the 12th century. The priory was dissolved in 1540.

References

Monasteries in Cheshire
Benedictine nunneries in England
12th-century establishments in England
Christian monasteries established in the 12th century
1540 disestablishments in England